Abrothrix sanborni, also known as Sanborn's grass mouse or Sanborn's akodont, is a species of rodent in the genus Abrothrix of family Cricetidae. It is found in southern Argentina and Chile, but may not be distinct from A. longipilis.

References

Mammals of Argentina
Mammals of Chile
Abrothrix
Mammals described in 1943
Taxonomy articles created by Polbot